Taja Cheek, known professionally as L'Rain, is an American experimentalist, multi-instrumentalist, composer, and curator known primarily as the lead vocalist and songwriter of her eponymous band. L'Rain has been recognized for experimental music that draws on a vast number of traditions and genres in a practice and aesthetic Cheek calls "approaching songness".

Her self-titled debut, L'Rain, was included in best-of-year lists by publications including Pitchfork and Bandcamp Daily; her second album, Fatigue (2021), was named the best album of the year by The Wire. She has collaborated with artists including Vagabon, Helado Negro, and Naama Tsabar, and performed with Kevin Beasley at the Whitney Museum of American Art.

Early life and career 
Cheek was born and raised in Crown Heights, Brooklyn, where she lived with her mother, father, and grandparents. Her father, Wyatt Cheek, worked in music marketing and promotion for entities including Select Records and Kiss FM; her grandmother ran a liquor store; and in the 1950s her grandfather owned a neighborhood jazz club. Cheek's mother, Lorraine C. Porter, taught physical education, health, math, and science in Brooklyn schools. The stage name L'Rain is an homage to Porter, who died before the release of the self-titled debut.

Cheek studied ballet and modern dance at The Ailey School and learned piano, cello, and Baroque recorder before picking up bass in high school, then forming and joining groups that included an Iron Maiden cover band. She attended Yale to study music but dropped the major, citing factors including a lack of diversity among the program's course offerings. She transferred to the American Studies program, where her major included a concentration in visual, audio, literary, and performance cultures; in 2011, she completed her Bachelor of Arts degree with distinction. While at Yale she worked as music director of radio station WYBC and booked shows.

After graduating, Cheek returned to New York. She resumed playing in and co-leading Brooklyn bands including Throw Vision; the group released their debut in 2013 and a 7-inch EP in 2015. She also began presenting and curating public art, working with organizations such as Creative Time and the High Line. In 2014, Cheek was a site manager for the Funk, God, Jazz, and Medicine: Black Radical Brooklyn exhibit, installing a radio station in a pink Cadillac outside the Utica Avenue A/C subway station in homage to Jitu Weusi, black nationalist community arts center The East, and jazz nonprofit and festival the Central Brooklyn Jazz Consortium. The same year, she co-organized "The Kara Walker Experience: WE ARE HERE", a public gathering of people of color at the Domino Sugar Refinery for Kara Walker's installation A Subtlety. Cheek began working for contemporary art institution MoMA PS1 in 2016, with curatorial work including co-organizing the Sunday Sessions and Warm Up series; as of 2021, she serves as Associate Curator.

In 2017, Cheek released the self-titled L'Rain on New York City-based label Astro Nautico. She composed and performs vocals, keyboards, synthesizers, guitar, bass, samples, and percussion on the album; L'Rain also features Alex Goldberg, Jeremy Powell, Kyp Malone (of TV on the Radio), and Andrew Lappin, who co-produced the album with Cheek. Pitchfork included L'Rain among their 20 Best Experimental Albums of 2017, and Bandcamp Daily listed the release as #10 in their Best Albums of 2017. L'Rain's second album, Fatigue, was released on Mexican Summer in 2021. The album met with wide acclaim, with positive reviews from outlets including Pitchfork and NPR. Cheek provides vocals and plays guitar, bass, synth, keyboards, piano, percussion, tape effects, and airhorn on the album, which also features an expanded roster of twenty collaborators.

In July 2021, Cheek performed at Mass MOCA after a week-long residency. She toured with Black Midi in the Fall of 2021  and will be touring with Animal Collective in Spring 2022.

Musical style

L'Rain often layers and loops her vocals, and her work frequently features samples from her collection of hundreds of field recordings, some pitch-shifted or otherwise manipulated beyond recognition. She has spoken in interviews about her work's tendency to evade or reject categorization, saying that she is "more interested in a Barthes, Death of the Author, approach to genre", values illegibility, and seeks to complicate assumptions about the relationship between identity and aesthetics: "I’m hyper-aware of how marketing and packaging happens for Black people and women and Black women [...] I like feeling a sense of agency in how those stories are told".

AllMusic described L'Rain as making "dreamy, genre-blurring music [...], reflecting on grief, change, joy, and resistance through a collage-like mixture of soul, psychedelia, gospel, musique concrète, and numerous other genres." Pitchfork described her 2021 album Fatigue as "painterly and methodical, daubing vocal loops over clattering percussion, sweeping strings, and resonant synths to create a shapeshifting strain of experimental pop." Reviewers have variously identified her style and influences as including free jazz, ambient, noise music, and disco; dance; "psychedelic orchestral pop" and "distorted shoegaze"; krautrock, outsider music, and hip hop; R&B and avant-garde rock; gospel, funk, and post-punk; and soul, drone, avant-pop, and musique concrète.

While Cheek is the sole fixed figure in L'Rain recordings and performances, she says the project follows a "more nuanced and collective [model]" than that of the "lone genius or creator": "I’m trying to find a way to nurture my own voice and singular vision, especially as a Black woman musician, while also acknowledging that I work collaboratively with a team that is essential to the project." As of June 2021, L'Rain's bandmates are Ben Chapoteau-Katz, Justin Felton, and Alwyn Robinson.

Discography

Studio albums

References

American experimental musicians
Living people
21st-century American women musicians
African-American women musicians
African-American composers
African-American women composers
Year of birth missing (living people)
21st-century African-American women
21st-century African-American musicians